The State Council of the Republic of Tatarstan is the regional parliament of Tatarstan, a federal subject of Russia. It consists of 100 deputies elected for five-year terms; 50 deputies are elected by single-member constituencies while the other 50 are elected in party lists.

The presiding officer is the Chairman of the State Council.

Elections

2019

See also
List of Chairmen of the State Council of the Republic of Tatarstan

References

External links 
  

Politics of Tatarstan
Tatarstan
Tatarstan